Gostkowice   is a village in the administrative district of Gmina Bogdaniec, within Gorzów County, Lubusz Voivodeship, in western Poland.

References

Gostkowice